, also known as Mount Yaedake or Yae-take, is a mountain in Motobu, Okinawa on Okinawa Island. Nakijin Castle and Nago Castle were built nearby in the 14th century. The mountain itself was used as a major Japanese defensive position during the Battle of Okinawa. Today it is famous for its annual  held in March.

References

Mountains of Okinawa Prefecture